ASN-209 UAV and its derivative are Chinese UAVs developed by Xi'an  Aisheng Technology Group Co., Ltd (西安爱生技术集团公司) ASN Technology Group Co., Ltd (西安爱生技术集团公司), also known as Northwestern Polytechnical University UAV Research Institute or 365th Institute , established in 1984.

ASN-209
ASN-209 is designed for Medium Altitude Medium Endurance (MAME) tactical missions.

Design
ASN-209 Tactical UAV System is composed of Aircraft Platform, Avionics, Airborne Mission Payload, Data Link, Ground Control Station and Launch and Recovery Equipment, ASN-209 UAV can perform aerial reconnaissance, battle field survey, target location, destroy validation and artillery fire adjustment in day and night in real time. ASN-209 uses digital flight control and navigation system, its flight control mode has manual, program and emergency control. In addition, ASN-209 uses rocket booster launch, parachute recovery which render the operating system of ASN-209 flexible due to the fact that no contact with an airport is needed, and the GCS allows multitasking and can be edited in real-time.
In civil application, it can be fitted with Synthetic Aperture Radar (SAR), electro-optical payload, and multi-function payload, etc. that can be applied for forest fire prevention, anti-drug action, communication, nature disaster forecast, ground observation, atmosphere measuring, aviation photo, resource detection, climate observation and artificial raining, etc.

In military operation, it can be with multiple operational configurations for Ground Moving Target Indication (GMTI), Electronic Intelligence (ELINT), Electronic Warfare (EW), Ground Target Designation (GTD) and Communication Relay.

ASN-209 uses  twin-boom pusher layout, rear installed engine disposition with high-set wings and a stabilizer linking the twin fins. Excellent overall aerodynamic design and EMC design enable the system to install many different kinds of airborne equipment, such as Electronic countermeasures (ECM), communication relay and weather detection. With a coverage radius is 200 km and endurance of 10 hours, ASN-209 UAV System can supervise big area and frontier within one sortie. In order to overcome with refueling issue, using two UAVs and switching them out when one reaches its 10-hour limit so that they can be used for 24 hours consecutively.

The practicality of the ASN-209 system reduces the needs for maintenance or parts from China, as ASN-209 can be deployed using a modified truck and is controlled using electronics equipment installed in a cargo van, which in turn overcomes the disadvantage of comparable US UAVs that depend on US parts and maintenance.

Development
The ASN-209 was developed in 2011 by ASN Technology Group, which is a Chinese company specialized in Unmanned Aerial Vehicle (UAV). Egypt and China had signed an agreement to build twelve ASN-209 UAVs including technology transfer in order to enhance Egypt's domestic drone industry. In addition, China uses fewer proprietary technologies in their designs in order to reduces licensing and manufacturing costs as the ASN-209 system costs 30 percent less  than comparable US design while providing many of the same performance and most of the same tasks.

In May 2012 six Egyptian drones of ASN-209 was built in collaboration with a foreign defence manufacturer during the first phase and are fully operational under the Egyptian armed forces according to Hamdy Weheba, the Chairman of the Arab Organization for Industrialization which he claimed that Egypt has started the production of the ASN-209 Multi-purpose UAV System and about 99.5% of the components are locally manufactured. He also claimed that with the latest manufacturing venture, Egypt is entering into the second phase of mass ASN-209 production.

Operators

 People's Liberation Army

 Egyptian armed forces

Specifications

Silver Eagle
Silver Eagle (Yin-Ying or Yinying, 银鹰) is a derivative of ASN-209 deployed by Chinese military. The most obvious visual difference between Silver Eagle and its predecessor ASN-209 is the addition of four vertically installed antenna, two of which are arranged in sequential order atop the fuselage, and one each on the wing, near the wingtip. Estimated range is around 150 km and the estimated endurance is several hours. Maiden flight of Silver Eagle took place in the coastal region of northeastern China on June 1, 2011 and lasted three and half hours. The UAV has since entered service with Chinese navy.

Silver Eagle is launched from a 6 x 6 truck, which is both the launching platform and transportation vehicle, and the UAV utilizes rocket assisted take-off. Presumably, there would be at least another vehicle housing the ground control station.  Very little information has been publicized by the official Chinese government sources, which only reveal (as of 2014) that Silver Eagle is a shore-based naval UAV. There are postulates that Silver Eagle can either act as a communication relay or electronic intelligence gathering platform, or as an aerial jamming platform, but such claims have yet to be confirmed.

See also

 ScanEagle
 List of unmanned aerial vehicles of the People's Republic of China

References

Unmanned aerial vehicles of China